Jiangzhou District is a district and the seat of Chongzuo, Guangxi, People's Republic of China.

Administrative divisions
There are 7 towns and 2 townships in the district:

Towns:
Taiping (太平镇), Xinhe (新和镇), Laituan (濑湍镇), Jiangzhou Town (江州镇), Zuozhou (左州镇), Nalong (那隆镇), Tuolu (驮卢镇)

Townships:
Luobai Township (罗白乡), Banli Township (板利乡)

References

External links

County-level divisions of Guangxi
Chongzuo